Hernando Castelo (23 August 1906 – 20 March 1966) was a Filipino sports shooter. He competed at the 1956 Summer Olympics and the 1960 Summer Olympics, 1954 Asian Games and 1962 Asian Games.

References

External links
 

1906 births
1966 deaths
Filipino male sport shooters
Olympic shooters of the Philippines
Shooters at the 1956 Summer Olympics
Shooters at the 1960 Summer Olympics
People from Cabanatuan
Sportspeople from Nueva Ecija
Asian Games medalists in shooting
Shooters at the 1954 Asian Games
Shooters at the 1962 Asian Games
Medalists at the 1954 Asian Games
Asian Games gold medalists for the Philippines
20th-century Filipino people